Hawkhead Hospital was a health facility on Hawkhead Road in Hawkhead, Renfrewshire, Scotland. The complex is Grade B listed.

History
The facility, which was designed by Thomas S. Tait in the Art Deco style, opened as the Paisley Infectious Diseases Hospital in 1936. The hospital joined the National Health Service in 1948 and eventually closed in 2005. The site was subsequently developed by Kier Group with many of the historic buildings being converted for residential use as Hawkhead Village.

See also
List of listed buildings in Paisley, Renfrewshire

References

Hospitals in Renfrewshire
1936 establishments in Scotland
Hospitals established in 1936
Hospital buildings completed in 1936
Defunct hospitals in Scotland
2005 disestablishments in Scotland
Hospitals disestablished in 2005
Buildings and structures in Paisley, Renfrewshire
Category B listed buildings in Renfrewshire